In mathematics, specifically in the representation theory of groups and algebras, an irreducible representation  or irrep of an algebraic structure  is a nonzero representation that has no proper nontrivial subrepresentation , with  closed under the action of .

Every finite-dimensional unitary representation on a Hilbert space  is the direct sum of irreducible representations. Irreducible representations are always indecomposable (i.e. cannot be decomposed further into a direct sum of representations), but converse may not hold, e.g. the two-dimensional representation of the real numbers acting by upper triangular unipotent matrices is indecomposable but reducible.

History

Group representation theory was generalized by Richard Brauer from the 1940s to give modular representation theory, in which the matrix operators act on a vector space over a field  of arbitrary characteristic, rather than a vector space over the field of real numbers or over the field of complex numbers. The structure analogous to an irreducible representation in the resulting theory is a simple module.

Overview

Let  be a representation i.e. a homomorphism  of a group  where  is a vector space over a field . However, it simplifies things greatly if we think of the space  without a basis.

A linear subspace  is called -invariant if  for all  and all . A representation  is said to be irreducible if it has only trivial subrepresentations (all representations can form a subrepresentation with the trivial -invariant subspaces, e.g. the whole vector space , and {0}). If there is a proper nontrivial invariant subspace,  is said to be reducible.

Notation and terminology of group representations

Group elements can be represented by matrices, although the term "represented" has a specific and precise meaning in this context. A representation of a group is a mapping from the group elements to the general linear group of matrices. The representation of a is written as

By definition of group representations, the representation of a group product is translated into matrix multiplication of the representations:

If  is the identity element of the group (so that , etc.), then  is an identity matrix, or identically a block matrix of identity matrices, since we must have

and similarly for all other group elements. The last two statements correspond to the requirement that  is a group homomorphism.

Reducible and irreducible representations 
A representation is reducible if it contains a nontrivial G-invariant subspace, that is to say, all the matrices  can be put in upper triangular block form by the same invertible matrix . In other words, if there is a similarity transformation:

which maps every matrix in the representation into the same pattern upper triangular blocks. Every ordered sequence minor block is a group subrepresentation. That is to say, if the representation is, for example, of dimension 2, then we have:

where  is a nontrivial subrepresentation. If we are able to find a matrix  that makes  as well, then  is not only reducible but also decomposable.

Notice: Even if a representation is reducible, its matrix representation may still not be the upper triangular block form.

Decomposable and indecomposable representations

A representation is decomposable if all the matrices  can be put in block-diagonal form by the same invertible matrix . In other words, if there is a similarity transformation:

which diagonalizes every matrix in the representation into the same pattern of diagonal blocks. Each such block is then a group subrepresentation independent from the others. The (k-dimensional, say) representation can be decomposed into a direct sum of  matrices:

If this is not possible, i.e. , then the representation is indecomposable.

Notice: Even if a representation is decomposable, its matrix representation may not be the diagonal block form.

Connection between irreducible representation and indecomposable representation 
An irreducible representation is by nature an indecomposable one. However, the converse may fail. 

But under some conditions, we do have an indecomposable representation being an irreducible representation. 

 When group  is finite, and it has a representation over field , then an indecomposable representation is an irreducible representation. 
 When group  is finite, and it has a representation over field , if we have , then an indecomposable representation is an irreducible representation.

Examples of irreducible representations

Trivial representation
All groups  have a one-dimensional, irreducible trivial representation by mapping all group elements to the identity transformation.

One-dimensional representation 
Any one-dimensional representation is irreducible since it has no proper nontrivial subspaces.

Irreducible complex representations

The irreducible complex representations of a finite group G can be characterized using results from character theory.

 Let  be a group.

Example of an irreducible representation over 
That is, there exists some  such that  for all .

Applications in theoretical physics and chemistry

In quantum physics and quantum chemistry, each set of degenerate eigenstates of the Hamiltonian operator comprises a vector space  for a representation of the symmetry group of the Hamiltonian, a "multiplet", best studied through reduction to its irreducible parts. Thus, in quantum mechanics, irreducible representations of the symmetry group of the system partially or completely label the energy levels of the system, allowing the selection rules to be determined.

Lie groups

Lorentz group

This allows them to derive relativistic wave equations.

See also

Associative algebras

Simple module
Indecomposable module
Representation of an associative algebra

Lie groups

 Representation theory of Lie algebras
 Representation theory of SU(2) 
 Representation theory of SL2(R) 
 Representation theory of the Galilean group
 Representation theory of diffeomorphism groups
 Representation theory of the Poincaré group
 Theorem of the highest weight

References

Books

Articles

Further reading

External links

, see chapter 40

Group theory
Representation theory
Theoretical physics
Theoretical chemistry
Symmetry